Portuguese Democratic Labour Party (in Portuguese: Partido Trabalhista Democrático Português) was a centre-left political party in Portugal. PTDP was founded on May 3, 1974, the first political party to be formed after the Carnation Revolution. PTDP didn't make much impact however, and the party was never legally registered.

Defunct political parties in Portugal
Political parties established in 1974
1974 establishments in Portugal